13th CDG Awards
February 22, 2011

Contemporary: Black Swan 

Period: The King's Speech 

Fantasy: Alice in Wonderland 
The 13th Costume Designers Guild Awards, honoring the best costume designs in film and television for 2010, were given on February 22, 2011 at the Beverly Hilton Hotel in Beverly Hills. The nominees were announced on January 21, 2011.

Nominees

Film
 Contemporary Film:
 Winner - Amy Westcott - Black Swan
 Michael Kaplan - Burlesque
 Jeffrey Kurland - Inception
 Jacqueline West - The Social Network
 Ellen Mirojnick - Wall Street: Money Never Sleeps

 Period Film:
 Winner - Jenny Beavan - The King's Speech
 Mark Bridges - The Fighter
 Mary Zophres - True Grit

 Fantasy Film:
 Winner - Colleen Atwood - Alice in Wonderland
 Sandy Powell - The Tempest
 Michael Wilkinson and Christine Bieselin Clark - Tron: Legacy

Television
 Made for Television Movie or Miniseries:
 Winner - Cindy Evans - Temple Grandin
 Penny Rose - The Pacific
 Rita Ryack - You Don't Know Jack

 Contemporary Television Series:
 Winner - Lou Eyrich - Glee
 Chrisi Karvonides-Dushenko - Big Love
 Randall Christensen, Daniella Gschwendtner, Steven Norman Lee - Dancing with the Stars
 Alix Friedberg - Modern Family
 Alonzo Wilson - Treme

 Period/Fantasy Television Series:
 Winner - John A. Dunn, Lisa Padovani - Boardwalk Empire
 Janie Bryant - Mad Men
 Joan Bergin - The Tudors

Commercial
 Commercial Costume Design:
 Winner - Aude Bronson-Howard - Chanel – "Bleu de Chanel"
 Julie Vogel - Dos Equis – "The Most Interesting Man in the World"
 Lydia Paddon - Netflix – "Western"
 Michelle Martini - Target – "Preparing for Race/Black Friday"

2010 film awards
2010 television awards
2010 guild awards
Costume Designers Guild Awards
2010 in fashion
2011 in American cinema
2011 in American television